The presiding officer of the Scottish Parliament is the speaker of the Scottish Parliament. The presiding officer is a member of the Scottish Parliament elected by the Scottish Parliament by means of an exhaustive ballot, and is ex officio the head of the Scottish Parliamentary Corporate Body. The presiding officer is considered a figurehead of the Scottish Parliament and has an office in Queensberry House.

Appointments to the Privy Council of the United Kingdom are made by the monarch, although in practice they are made only on the advice of the UK government. To date all presiding officers have been appointed members of the Privy Council, and therefore entitled to use the style 'Right Honourable'.

The office of presiding officer was established by the Scotland Act 1998. The current presiding officer is Alison Johnstone, who was elected on 13 May 2021, following the 2021 Scottish Parliament election. She is the second woman to hold the office and the first former member of the Scottish Greens to do so.

Office
The presiding officer presides over the Parliament's debates, determining which members may speak, and maintains order during debate. The presiding officer is expected to be strictly non-partisan, with some similarities in this respect to the tradition of the Speaker of the House of Commons. For this reason, they renounce all affiliation with their former political party for the duration of their term. They do not take part in debate, or vote except to break ties. Even then, the convention is that when the presiding officer uses their tie-breaking vote, they do so in favour of advancing debate, but on final ballots, retaining the status quo. The presiding officer is also assisted in their duties by 2 deputies. They have the same powers as the presiding officer; they keep their party affiliation but remain impartial when presiding.

In 2006 the St Andrews Fund for Scots Heraldry commemorated the hosting of the Heraldic & Genealogical Congress in Scotland by commissioning a ceremonial robe for the presiding officer to wear, however as of May 2017, it appears no presiding officer has worn the robe.

The Scottish National Party proposes that in the event of independence, the presiding officer's post be replaced with that of chancellor of Scotland. In addition to presiding over the Scottish Parliament, the chancellor would possess additional constitutional powers during the absence of the monarch from Scotland; chiefly, the chancellor should act in a role similar to a governor-general in the other Commonwealth realms.

List of presiding officers

List of deputy presiding officers

Current presiding officer and deputy presiding officer

See also
Presidency of the old Scots Parliament (pre-1707):
Lord Chancellor of Scotland
Lord High Commissioner to the Parliament of Scotland
Presiding Officer (disambiguation page)
Speaker (politics)
Preses

References

External links

Government of Scotland
Scottish Parliament
Scottish Parliament
 
Sotland